Nemoderma is the only genus in the family Nemodermataceae and order Nemodermatales of the brown algae (class Phaeophyceae).  The genus contains only a single species, Nemoderma tingitanum.

References

Further reading

External links
Nemoderma tingitanum at Algaebase

Brown algae
Monotypic brown algae genera